Anchinia cristalis is a species of moth of the family Depressariidae. It is found in most of Europe (except most of the Balkan Peninsula, Portugal, Great Britain, Ireland, the Netherlands, Norway, Finland, and Ukraine) east to the eastern parts of the Palearctic realm.

The wingspan is 14–19 mm. Adults are on wing from late May to early July.

The larvae live between spun leaves of Thymelaea passerina, Daphne mezereum and Daphne laureola.

References

External links
Lepiforum e.V.

Moths described in 1763
Anchinia
Moths of Japan
Moths of Europe
Taxa named by Giovanni Antonio Scopoli